Eucalyptus angularis, commonly known as Lesueur phantom mallee, is a rare species of mallee that is endemic to the south-west of Western Australia. It has rough bark at the base of the stems, smooth greyish bark above, lance-shaped adult leaves and flower buds in groups of about eleven, but the characteristics of the flowers and fruit have not been recorded.

Description
It has grey rough or flaky bark at the base of the stems, and smooth grey bark above. The mature buds, flowers and fruit have not been recorded.

Taxonomy
Eucalyptus angularis was first formally described by the botanists Ian Brooker and Stephen Hopper in 1993 in the journal Nuytsia from material they collected on Mount Benia in 1983. The specific epithet (angularis) means "angled", referring to the branchlets.

Distribution
Lesueur phantom mallee is only known from two small stands on lateritic breakaways near Mount Lesueur and the type location in the Wheatbelt region in the south-west of Western Australia.

Conservation status
This mallee eucalypt is classified as "Priority Two" by the Western Australian Government Department of Parks and Wildlife meaning that it is poorly known and from only one or a few locations.

See also
List of Eucalyptus species

References

Eucalypts of Western Australia
Trees of Australia
angularis
Myrtales of Australia
Plants described in 1993
Taxa named by Ian Brooker
Taxa named by Stephen Hopper